The 1902 Kilkenny Senior Hurling Championship was the 14th staging of the Kilkenny Senior Hurling Championship since its establishment by the Kilkenny County Board.

On 17 May 1903, Tullaroan won the championship after a 3-16 to 0-01 defeat of Mooncoin in the final. This was their seventh championship title overall and their second title in succession.

Results

Final

References

Kilkenny Senior Hurling Championship
Kilkenny Senior Hurling Championship